Adaören can refer to the following villages in Turkey:

 Adaören, Beypazarı
 Adaören, Dursunbey